Ivan Mercep  (22 February 1930 – 8 April 2014) was a New Zealand architect.

Early life and family
Born in Taumarunui in 1930 to a Croatian family, Mercep was educated at Sacred Heart College, Auckland and Auckland University College, from where he graduated with a Bachelor of Architecture in 1954. He married Halina Eva Trusz, and one of their sons is broadcaster Simon Mercep.

Architectural practice
 
Following university, Mercep spent six years working and travelling overseas, before returning to New Zealand in 1960.  After working with KRTA, he entered into partnership in 1963 with Rodney Davies, Stephen Jelicich and Graham Smith to form what would become JASMaD (later Jasmax, one of the largest architectural firms in New Zealand). In 1964, he became a registered architect in New Zealand. He helped design Hoani Waititi Marae in West Auckland and Waipapa Marae at the University of Auckland. Mercep was project architect for Samoa House / Maota Samoa on Auckland's Karangahape Road, designed to house the Samoan consulate-general, and completed in 1978. The building won a New Zealand Institute of Architects national award in 1980.

Honours and awards
In the 1997 Queen's Birthday Honours, Mercep was appointed an Officer of the New Zealand Order of Merit, for services to architecture. He was awarded the gold medal of the New Zealand Institute of Architects in 2008.

References

1930 births
2014 deaths
People from Taumarunui
New Zealand people of Croatian descent
University of Auckland alumni
New Zealand architects
Officers of the New Zealand Order of Merit
Recipients of the NZIA Gold Medal